GJ or Gj may refer to:

Science and technology
 Gigajoule (GJ), a unit of energy
 Gastrojejunal feeding tube, in medicine
 Gliese–Jahreiß Catalogue, in star designators

Transport codes
 Gujarat, the Indian state in vehicle registrations
 Eurofly, an Italian airline (by defunct IATA code)
 Mexicargo, a Mexican airline (defunct IATA code)

Other uses
 Gj (letter), a Latin digraph
 Gharjamai, a live-in son-in-Law
 Gilets jaunes (yellow vests) movement, grassroots political movement in France
 "GJ!", a song by Babymetal on the 2016 album Metal Resistance

See also
 Good job (disambiguation)